Coquille River may refer to:

 Coquille River (Oregon)
 Coquille River (Normandin River), in Saguenay-Lac-Saint-Jean, Quebec, Canada

See also
 Coquille River Falls, a two-tier waterfall located in the far north tip of the Rogue River–Siskiyou National Forest, just east of Port Orford, on the Oregon coast in Coos County, Oregon